The Satan Bug is a 1965 American crime science fiction suspense film from United Artists, produced and directed by John Sturges, that stars George Maharis, Richard Basehart, Anne Francis, and Dana Andrews. The screenplay by James Clavell and Edward Anhalt was loosely based on the 1962 novel of the same name by Alistair MacLean, written under the pseudonym Ian Stuart. The film score was composed by Jerry Goldsmith. The film featured the first use of a stabilized camera mount, invented by Nelson Tyler, placed on a helicopter.

Plot 

Lee Barrett, a private investigator and former intelligence agent discharged for his outspoken views, is approached by a man with a tempting offer to join a political organization opposing bioweapons. His refusal proves the correct response, as the man is an impersonator sent by his former boss, Eric Cavanaugh, to test his loyalty. Barrett is asked by Cavanaugh to investigate the murder of the security chief of Station Three, a top-secret bioweapons laboratory in the desert of southern California—and the disappearance of its director and head scientist, Dr. Baxter. After they arrive at the station and wait for a time lock on the sealed laboratory to open, they are advised by another scientist, Dr. Gregor Hoffman, to seal the laboratory using concrete.  Hoffman informs them that there are two lethal bioweapons in the laboratory, a strain of botulinus that oxidizes eight hours after its release, and a recently developed virus that he calls the "Satan Bug", which could kill all life on Earth in a matter of months.  Determined to discover what happened in the room and taking extreme precautions, Barrett enters to find Dr. Baxter dead, with the vials containing the "Satan Bug" and 1200 grams of botulinus missing.

A mysterious telegram leads Barrett to a nearby hotel where he has a surprise reunion with his old flame, Ann, the daughter of his superior, General Williams, who has flown in from Washington to supervise the investigation. Ann reveals that she sent the telegram, and that she has been assigned to Barrett as his partner, an arrangement neither minds. At her father's home, Barrett's speculation that a lunatic with a messiah complex is behind the theft is confirmed by a telegram, threatening to release the viruses unless Station Three is destroyed.

Barrett and Ann discover another scientist from the station (not heard from since the theft) is lying dead in his swimming pool. A phone call to the scientist's home reveals the name Charles Reynolds Ainsley, a reclusive millionaire crackpot and pharmaceutical tycoon who fits Barrett's profile and quickly becomes the focus of the investigation. After a demonstration incident in Florida proves the thieves' willingness to use the botulinus, General Williams receives a phone call threatening to release more of the toxin in Los Angeles County unless Station Three is closed. The caller hangs up before he can be traced, but not before confirming that he is Charles Reynolds Ainsley.

A police tip brings Barrett and Ann to the location of where a car broke down and was left abandoned during the evening of the theft. Deducing that the driver was involved, Barrett with Ann's help locates an airtight steel box containing the missing vials in a nearby stream, only to be confronted by two armed men, the thieves. They are taken with the box to the home of Dr. Hoffman, the other conspirator in the theft, who decides to take them hostage, unaware that they are being followed. It transpires that Veritti and Donald, the two men working with Hoffman, have hidden some vials with a time activating device in Los Angeles. At some point, the flask containing the "Satan Bug" is separated from the others by Hoffman, leaving the rest with Veritti and Donald, along with the hostages, despite an attempt by Barrett and Ann to overpower them. Soon the henchmen realize that they are being shadowed by two security agents in a car.

After a confrontation at an abandoned gas station, Veritti and Donald decide to lock the two agents along with Barrett and Ann in the garage. Realizing that the thugs intend to kill them, Barrett persuades them to keep Ann as a hostage, and as they leave they shatter one of the vials.  Though both agents are killed, Barrett survives by forcing an exit and setting the garage afire.  After an unsuccessful attempt to radio for help, he stops a passing car being driven by Hoffman, who has pulled a double cross on his own men. Barrett makes a deal to learn the location of the flasks in Los Angeles in return for the closure of Station Three, aware by now that Hoffman is actually Ainsley. After they hear an announcement on the car radio reporting the closure of Station Three (which Barrett knows is false, having arranged it earlier), they are intercepted by two men revealing themselves as security agents. Arresting Ainsley, they take him and Barrett in their car towards Los Angeles. Meanwhile, Veritti and Donald are killed at a roadblock in trying to escape, the flasks they are carrying are safely retrieved, and Ann is reunited with her father, who assures her Barrett may still be alive, his body not having been found at the gas station.

Barrett has realized that the "agents" driving him and Ainsley are more of Ainsley's security guards on their way to rendezvous with a helicopter flying above them. After single-handedly taking them down, he again confronts Ainsley, who threatens to break the flask containing the "Satan Bug", telling Barrett that he waited to steal the virus until the vaccine could be isolated, which is why Baxter and the other scientist were murdered.  Now that the vaccine is in his blood, Ainsley is immune. He declares his willingness to destroy the world and then live on in it alone rather than give up the power he holds. The helicopter lands, piloted by another of Ainsley's men. Another uneasy deal is made between Barrett and Ainsley, and they fly off, eventually finding themselves above Los Angeles as it is being evacuated. In the meantime, a cryptic doodle left by Veritti leads Ann and the authorities to surmise that the other vials are hidden at the Los Angeles baseball stadium, and during an intense search, they are located in the ice of a concession stand, attached to a bomb.

Above in the helicopter, Barrett notes it is flying past Los Angeles, meaning Ainsley is pulling another double-cross. Barrett fights with the pilot who tries to throw him out of the helicopter, only to be thrown out instead. Barrett is in danger of falling out after him, but manages to pull himself back to safety. During the fight, Ainsley drops the flask containing the "Satan Bug", and as it is about to tumble out, Barrett grabs it at the last second. Having served as an army rescue helicopter pilot, Barrett successfully takes over the controls, then covers Ainsley with a gun, pointing out he has nothing now. Ainsley throws himself out of the helicopter rather than reveal the location of the missing vials, unaware that they are now safely disarmed. After contacting Ann and his superiors, Barrett prepares to land, commenting things are back to where they started.

Cast

Unbilled roles (in order of appearance)
 John Hubbard: Uniformed guard;  at Station Three, standing next to Raskin as they observe the landing of Agent Reagan's helicopter [Hubbard does not speak]
 James W. Gavin: Helicopter pilot; transporting Agent Reagan: "Yes, sir."
 Harold Gould: Dr. Ostrer; scientist at the base who passes by Reagan: "Reagan, I've gotta talk to you."
 Russ Bender: Mason; guard sitting at desk as Reagan enters the compound: "Six, sir. Eh… Doctor Baxter, Doctor Hoffman, Doctor Yang and three technicians."
 Noam Pitlik: Clerk at Desert Air Motel; "Oh, yes, Mr. Barrett. You're in suite fifteen."
 Michael Barrier: Helicopter pilot; tracking the car carrying Barrett, Hoffman, Ann, Donald and Veretti: "Getting a little difficult to keep 'em in sight. This is pretty rough country and it's closing in on the road."
 William Bryant: SDI agent; one of Cavanaugh's men, driving the car which follows the vehicle carrying Barrett, Ann, Donald and Veretti: "They've turned left on the Seco Road now. They—uh—slowed down and—well, for a moment we got awfully close to them."
 James Doohan: SDI agent; one of Cavanaugh's men, in the passenger seat of the car which follows the vehicle carrying Barrett, Ann, Donald and Veretti. Doohan shares his scenes with William Bryant, but, of the two, Bryant is the only one who has a speaking role.
 Carey Loftin: SDI agent; arrives at the site of the jackknifed truck and starts a conversation with Donald: "Won't be long, he said. Did you ever hear a cop say anything else? It'll be hours."
 Paul Sorensen: SDI agent; stopped at the site of the jackknifed truck and starts a conversation with Veretti: "Look at all those cans and busted beer bottles. You'd think people wouldn't throw things out there like that."
 Tol Avery: Police captain; in charge of searching Dodger Stadium: "Hello! Yes, we're here looking. Nothing. Yes, we'll look in there. Of course, we'll look in there. Yeah, yeah, I know ..."
 Lawrence Montaigne: Uniformed military radar specialist tracking; the path of the helicopter carrying Hoffman: "Now here's the helicopter, sir. We've kept everything away from it, but we think it's the one."
 Lee Remick: Waitress; at night club where Barrett is initially called.

See also
List of American films of 1965

References

External links

 }
 
 
 
 
 The Satan Bug film review at AlistairMacLean.com

1965 films
1960s science fiction thriller films
1960s spy thriller films
American science fiction thriller films
American spy thriller films
Films about infectious diseases
Films based on British novels
Films based on science fiction novels
Films based on works by Alistair MacLean
Films directed by John Sturges
Films scored by Jerry Goldsmith
Films set in California
Films shot in California
Films with screenplays by James Clavell
United Artists films
Films with screenplays by Edward Anhalt
1960s English-language films
1960s American films